Events in the year 1871 in India.

Incumbents
Richard Bourke, 6th Earl of Mayo, Viceroy

Events
National income - ₹3,348 million

Law
 12 October – Criminal Tribes Act enacted by British rule in India, which named over 160 communities "Criminal Tribes", i.e. hereditary criminals. It was repealed in 1949.
Pensions Act
Cattle Trespass Act
Limitation Act
India Stock Dividends Act (British statute)

Births 
 7 August —Abanindranath Tagore, India writer and painter (died 1951).

References